Nunthorpe is a railway station on the Esk Valley Line, which runs between  and  via Nunthorpe. It is owned by Network Rail and managed by Northern Trains.

One of the two passing loops on the line is located here and there is a level crossing at the eastern end. The signal box that operates it also supervises the movements of trains on the entire branch and remotely controls the junction further down the line at Battersby.

History
Nunthorpe was originally on the Middlesbrough and Guisborough Railway line from Middlesbrough to Guisborough and opened in 1854. In 1964, the line between Nunthorpe and Guisborough was closed, meaning Nunthorpe was no longer a junction and only a station on the line to Whitby via Battersby.
The December 2007 timetable brought about significant changes, and the service is now better than it has been since the mid-1980s when there was an hourly Nunthorpe – Middlesbrough service including seven Whitby trains.

Facilities
The station is unmanned and has no ticketing provision, so all tickets must be purchased prior to travel or on the train. The main buildings still stand, but are now used as private residential accommodation. A waiting shelter is located on platform 2 (used by trains to Whitby and those that terminate here and return to ), whilst platform 1 has a canopied waiting area adjoining the main building. Digital CIS displays, timetable posters and a public telephone are provided to offer train running information. Step-free access is available to both platforms via the level crossing.

Services 

Following the May 2021 timetable change, the station is served by an hourly service between Middlesbrough and Nunthorpe, with two trains per day (excluding Sunday) continuing to Battersby, and six per day (four on Sunday) continuing to Whitby. Most trains continue to Newcastle via Hartlepool. All services are operated by Northern Trains.

Rolling stock used: Class 156 Super Sprinter and Class 158 Express Sprinter

References

External links
 
 

Former North Eastern Railway (UK) stations
DfT Category F2 stations
Railway stations in Great Britain opened in 1854
Northern franchise railway stations